Eva Selin Lindgren (1936 – 3 September 2011) was a Swedish Centre Party politician and a professor in nuclear physics. She was a member of the Riksdag from 2006 to September 2010.

References

External links

Eva Selin Lindgren at the Riksdag website

Members of the Riksdag from the Centre Party (Sweden)
1936 births
2011 deaths
Women members of the Riksdag
21st-century Swedish women politicians